Auckengill is a  settlement,  south of John o' Groats, on the east coast of Caithness, within the Scottish council area of Highland.

Museum
As Caithness is the Viking capital of mainland Scotland, Auckengill has a museum of Viking history called the Northlands Viking Centre. The museum examines the history of the Norse from Norway to Shetland, Orkney and Caithness. On display are models of the Viking settlement at Freswick and a Viking Longship. There is also a shop and picnic area. The museum is the site of the annual Scottish-Scandinavian Northlands Festival in September.

Gallery

References

See also
 List of places in Highland

Populated places in Caithness